Black Champion is a variety of potato with purple skin colour that produces round, flattened tubers.  Davidson (1936) described this as an old variety found growing in the Midlands of Ireland but of no commercial value. Noted by Kehoe (1986) as being unique to the Irish potato collection.

References 

Potato cultivars
Potatoes